Paxsi (Aymara for "moon", Hispanicized spelling Pacsi) is a mountain in the Andes of Peru, about  high. It is situated in Pampamarca District of La Unión Province in the Arequipa Region. Paxsi lies south of the Chawpimayu (Quechua for "central river", Hispanicized Chaupimayo) or Wayllapaña (Huayllapaña), a right  affluent of the Cotahuasi River.

References 

Mountains of Peru
Mountains of Arequipa Region